God Grew Tired of Us is a 2006 American documentary film about three of the "Lost Boys of Sudan", a group of some 25,000 young men who have fled the wars in Sudan since the 1980s, and their experiences as they move to the United States. The film was written and directed by Christopher Dillon Quinn.

Synopsis
God Grew Tired of Us chronicles the arduous journey of three Southern Sudanese men, John Bul Dau, Daniel Pach and Panther Bior, to the United States where they strive for a brighter future. As young boys in the 1980s, they had walked a thousand miles to escape their war-ridden homeland, and then had to make another arduous journey to escape Ethiopia.

During the five years they walked in search of safety, thousands died from starvation, dehydration, bomb raids and genocidal murder.  Finally, they found relative safety in Kenya’s Kakuma refugee camp.  In 2001, 3,600 lost boys, including John, Daniel and Panther, were invited by the United States to live in America. Assisted by Catholic Charities International, the three boys uproot their lives and once again embark on a journey, leaving behind thousands of other refugees who, in the course of their traumatic odyssey, have become their adopted extended family.  They must now learn to adapt to the shock of being thrust into the economically intense culture of the United States. They dedicate themselves to doing whatever they can do to help those they left behind in Kakuma, and to discover the fate of their parents and family.

The title comes from a statement by John, in expressing that he thought the suffering and killings he saw during his country's civil war may have been the final judgment on the earth spoken of in the Bible, because "God was tired of us," "tired of the bad things the people were doing."

God Grew Tired of Us was produced, written and directed by Christopher Dillon Quinn and narrated by Nicole Kidman; the executive producer was Brad Pitt.  The title of the documentary is a quote from John Dau discussing the despair he and other Sudanese felt during the civil war.

Awards
At the 2006 Sundance Film Festival, the film won both the "Grand Jury Prize: Documentary" and the "Audience Award" in the "Independent Film Competition: Documentary" category.

The film also won best documentary at the Deauville Film Festival in France and the Galway Film Festival in Ireland.

Christopher Dillon Quinn was awarded The Emerging Documentary Filmmaker Award by the International Documentary Association in 2007 for directing God Grew Tired of Us.

Music
 Guramayle – Gigi
 Gua – Emmanuel Jal
 Mai Wah Ihtagab – Abd El Gadir Salim

See also
International Rescue Committee

References

External links
 
 
 
 
 
 

Lost Boys of Sudan
2006 films
Documentary films about refugees
American documentary films
2006 documentary films
Films set in Sudan
2000s English-language films
2000s American films